Eileen Cummings (born 1943) is a teacher, policy and liaison officer and Indigenous leader in the Northern Territory of Australia. She is a member of the Rembarrnga Ngalakan ethnic groups. She is a member of the  'Stolen Generation' and is an activist for living members of that group.

Early life
Eileen Cummings was born in Arnhem Land in the Barunga-Wugularr region where she lived with her mother, Florrie Lindsay and her mother's husband, Chuckerduck. She is a member of the 'Stolen Generation' having been removed from her family as a four-and-a-half year old from a Mainoru Station in central Arnhem Land in 1949. At first, she related that she was excited to be going for a ride when a red truck came to pick her up without her mother's knowledge, but then she started to miss her mother and cry after they left Mainoru. She was taken to Maranboy Police Station and then lived at Croker Island. Her name was changed and she was taught to be ashamed of her Aboriginal identity while growing up in the institution. Cummings lived at the institution until she was fifteen, and then stayed in a foster home in Darwin until she was eighteen. When she was an adult, she returned to see her mother, Lindsay.

Career 
Cummings was the first Indigenous person in the Northern Territory to qualify as a pre-school teacher. She also worked as a policy adviser to the Northern Territory Chief Minister in the Office of Women's Policies where she gave advice on women's issues. She coordinated the consultation in the development of the Aboriginal Family Violence Strategy and was a co-author.

In the 2013 Federal Election, Cummings was unsuccessful as Australian First Nations Political Party candidate for the Division of Solomon in the House of Representatives.

She is the Chairperson of the Northern Territory Stolen Generations Aboriginal Corporation. She works to bring compensation to those who are part of the Stolen Generation and on Sorry Day, 2017, filed a case with the NT Stolen Generations organization against the federal government.

She is a University Fellow of Charles Darwin University.

References

Citations

Sources
 

Australian women in politics
Australian educators
1943 births
Living people
Indigenous Australian politicians
Members of the Stolen Generations